This is the discography of British alternative rock band the Wonder Stuff.

Albums

Studio albums

Live albums

Compilation albums

Other albums

Video albums

EPs

Singles

References

Discographies of British artists
Rock music discographies